Rachel Honderich (born 21 April 1996) is a Canadian badminton player from Toronto, Ontario. She has been one of the top ranked women's individual and doubles player on the continent and a contender in major international competitions. She is a vice-national champion in women's singles and has won several international titles since 2010.

Career
Honderich won her first senior international title at the 2014 Czech International tournament in the women's doubles partnered with Michelle Li. Honderich clinched the silver and bronze medals at the 2015 Pan American Games in the women's singles and doubles respectively. At the 2017 Pan American Championships, she crowned double titles, won the women's singles and mixed doubles event. She competed at the 2014 and 2018 Commonwealth Games. Honderich won her first gold medal at the Pan American Games in the women's doubles partnered with Kristen Tsai in 2019 Lima.

In June 2021, Honderich was named to Canada's Olympic team.

Achievements

Pan American Games 
Women's singles

Women's doubles

Pan Am Championships 
Women's singles

Women's doubles

Mixed doubles

BWF Grand Prix (2 runners-up) 
The BWF Grand Prix had two levels, the Grand Prix and Grand Prix Gold. It was a series of badminton tournaments sanctioned by the Badminton World Federation (BWF) and played between 2007 and 2017.

Women's singles

Mixed doubles

  BWF Grand Prix Gold tournament
  BWF Grand Prix tournament

BWF International Challenge/Series (11 titles, 6 runners-up) 
Women's singles

Women's doubles

Mixed doubles

  BWF International Challenge tournament
  BWF International Series tournament
  BWF Future Series tournament

References

External links 
 
 
 

1996 births
Living people
Sportspeople from Toronto
Canadian female badminton players
Badminton players at the 2020 Summer Olympics
Olympic badminton players of Canada
Badminton players at the 2014 Commonwealth Games
Badminton players at the 2018 Commonwealth Games
Badminton players at the 2022 Commonwealth Games
Commonwealth Games competitors for Canada
Badminton players at the 2011 Pan American Games
Badminton players at the 2015 Pan American Games
Badminton players at the 2019 Pan American Games
Pan American Games gold medalists for Canada
Pan American Games silver medalists for Canada
Pan American Games bronze medalists for Canada
Pan American Games medalists in badminton
Medalists at the 2015 Pan American Games
Medalists at the 2019 Pan American Games
20th-century Canadian women
21st-century Canadian women